The Franklin County Courthouse, Southern District is located at 607 East Main Street (Arkansas Highway 22) in Charleston, Arkansas.  It is a -story brick building, its bays divided by brick pilasters, and its roof topping a metal cornice.  Its entrance is framed by brick pilasters with cast stone heads, and topped by a round arch with a cast stone keystone.  The building was built in 1923 to a design by Little Rock architect Frank Gibb.

The building was listed on the National Register of Historic Places in 1976.

See also

List of county courthouses in Arkansas
National Register of Historic Places listings in Franklin County, Arkansas

References

Courthouses on the National Register of Historic Places in Arkansas
Government buildings completed in 1923
Buildings and structures in Franklin County, Arkansas
National Register of Historic Places in Franklin County, Arkansas
Historic district contributing properties in Arkansas